Ryotaro Hironaga (廣永 遼太郎, born 9 January 1990) is a Japanese football player for Vissel Kobe.

National team career
In August 2007, Hironaga was elected Japan U-17 national team for 2007 U-17 World Cup. He played full time in all 3 matches.

Club statistics
Updated to 22 February 2019.

References

External links
Profile at Sanfrecce Hiroshima

1990 births
Living people
Association football people from Tokyo Metropolis
Japanese footballers
Japan youth international footballers
J1 League players
J2 League players
Japan Football League players
FC Tokyo players
Tokyo Musashino United FC players
Fagiano Okayama players
Kataller Toyama players
Sanfrecce Hiroshima players
Vissel Kobe players
Association football goalkeepers
People from Nishitōkyō, Tokyo